Pachiot is a large village in the suburbs of Rawalakot city, Azad Kashmir, Pakistan. It is home to the largest union council in Azad Kashmir, which connects many of the local union councils.

Origins 
Pachiot was the name of a local group of five villages, which later became the name of the large area between Goi Nala and Nala Mahall, until a village by the same name was founded in 1947.

Union council 
Pachiot's union council comprises many local villages including Datote, Jovarabad, Paniola, Bagiana, Chiroti, Barain, Ballari, Khairian, Lagiryat, Numbl, Sumlary, Baglay Sangal Khater, Sair Gohra, Argali, Topi, Bari Danna, Baroota, and many other small villages.

Notable people 
 Sardar Sayab Khalid, Former Speaker and current MLA in the AJK Assembly
+   Sardar ishaq khan late from baglay village did a notable services for union council pachiot & including all azad Kashmir .

Union councils of Poonch District